Goeppertia crocata (syn. Calathea crocata), the saffron-coloured calathea or eternal flame plant, is a species of flowering plant in the family Marantaceae, native to Bahia and Espírito Santo states of eastern Brazil. It has gained the Royal Horticultural Society's Award of Garden Merit as a hothouse ornamental.

Description
G. crocata is prized for its "hot", yellow-orange flowers. The flower stems are straight and slightly taller than the leaves, making the flowers more prominent.

References

crocata
Endemic flora of Brazil
Flora of Bahia
Flora of Espírito Santo
Plants described in 2012